This is a list of Dutch television related events from 2010.

Events
7 February - Sieneke is selected to represent Netherlands at the 2010 Eurovision Song Contest with her song "Ik ben verliefd (Sha-la-lie)". She is selected to be the fifty-first Dutch Eurovision entry during Nationaal Songfestival held at Studio Baarn in Utrecht.
29 May - Jaap van Reesema wins the third series of X Factor, becoming the programme's first man to be crowned as winner.
10 September - 57-year-old opera singer Martin Hurkens wins the third series of Holland's Got Talent.

Debuts
17 September - The Voice of Holland (2010–present)

Television shows

1950s
NOS Journaal (1956–present)

1970s
Sesamstraat (1976–present)

1980s
Jeugdjournaal (1981–present)
Het Klokhuis (1988–present)

1990s
Goede tijden, slechte tijden (1990–present)

2000s
X Factor (2006–present)
Holland's Got Talent (2008–present)

Ending this year

Births

Deaths

See also
2010 in the Netherlands